The Better Farming Train was an agricultural demonstration train which toured Victoria, Australia in the 1920s and 1930s to promote better farming practices. It was the first of two agricultural demonstration trains to run in Australia.

Background
The idea of special trains to promote better agricultural practices was developed in Canada in the early years of the 20th century. In 1904, special trains brought farmers to the Dominion Experimental Farm in Indian Head, Saskatchewan, Canada to demonstrate farming techniques. From 1914 to 1922, a Better Farming Train ran throughout Saskatchewan.

The Victorian train was devised by Harold Clapp, Chairman of Commissioners of the Victorian Railways, and Dr Samuel Cameron, the Victorian Director of Agriculture. It was operated jointly by the Victorian Departments of Agriculture, Railways, Education and Public Health. The agricultural content of the train was devised by Hubert Mullett, an agricultural scientist with the Department of Agriculture and later Director of Agriculture.

The train

The Department of Agriculture described the train as an "agricultural college on wheels". Fifteen carriages were fitted out with displays covering livestock, dairy, crop production, pasture, farm machinery, cooking and infant welfare. The train was painted bright yellow to attract attention and included sleeping accommodation for the 80 staff.

A typical composition, taken from the May 1925 tour, was:
 Car 1: Special car Victoria for staff accommodation
 Car 2: Louvre van with electric generator and live stock fodder
 Cars 3-5: Cattle trucks, each with three padded compartments.
 Car 6: An open truck with six compartments for pigs.
 Car 7: A flat car used as a lecture platform.
 Car 8: A corridor carriage fitted with display tables of agricultural utensils.
 Car 9: A carriage with a display of veterinary exhibits.
 Car 10: A carriage of potato exhibits.
 Car 11: A carriage displaying wool production techniques, various types of weeds and grasses and soil analysis techniques.
 Car 12: A carriage of fruit production techniques.

Tours
The full train made 38 tours of regional Victoria and into southern New South Wales and eastern South Australia. The displays were varied depending on the area visited, for example dairy in Gippsland and grain in the Wimmera. In addition, the "Domestic" and "Women's" sections of the train, featuring baby health, needlework and cookery, made independent tours to some locations and a Wool Demonstration Train ran in 1934.

The first tour departed Melbourne on 13 October 1924 and toured Gippsland with the first stop at Bunyip. The response from the public was beyond expectations, with some people travelling  to see the train, and lecture cars proved to be too small. There were also criticisms of some of the arrangements for the visiting public. Between 500 and 2,000 people visited the train at each location and the tour was so successful that a second tour was planned before the first one had returned to Melbourne.

At the end of the 6th tour, Dr Cameron wrote "I have no hesitation whatever in saying that the Better Farming Train ... has made a greater appeal to the practical farmer and the younger generation of agriculturalists than anything that has hitherto been attained in Australia".

Tours became less frequent during the Great Depression and a temporary suspension was considered in 1930, however the Minister for Agriculture William Slater said it had been of inestimable value. With state finances becoming tight, in May 1932 the Commonwealth Bank made a grant of £600 to finance the next tour. The final tour was in 1935 when funding was withdrawn.

Reviving the train was considered in July 1939 if assistance was available from the Commonwealth, however this was prevented by the outbreak of World War II.

Interest from other states
In December 1924, the Government of South Australia made enquiries about borrowing the train for a tour of that state. Experts from South Australia visited Victoria in 1926 to examine the train, and there was interest from New South Wales and Queensland. The train eventually toured South Australia in 1929.

New South Wales operated its own Better Farming Train between 1927 and 1929.

Tour locations

Gallery

See also
 Better Farming Train (Saskatchewan), Canadian inspiration for the Victorian train.
 Reso Train, National Resources Development train inspired by the Better Farming Train.

References

External links
Honey and egg car of the Better Farming Train, Victorian Department of Agriculture, taken in 1924 or 1925 (via Trove)
The Better Farming Train, Department of Environment and Primary Industries

1924 establishments in Australia
1935 disestablishments in Australia
Rail transport in Victoria (Australia)
History of agriculture in Australia
Agriculture in Victoria (Australia)
Economic history of Victoria (Australia)